The Soviet Census held on January 6, 1937, was the most controversial of the censuses taken within the Soviet Union. The census results were not published because the census showed much lower population figures than anticipated, especially in Ukraine due to the Holodomor famine, although it still showed a population growth from the last census in 1926, from 147 million to 162 million people in 1937.

Delays
After the First All-Union Census of the Soviet Union of 1926, the next census was planned to be held in 1933. On 15 March 1932, the formal commission on census organization, chaired by Valerian Osinsky was created by the Statistical Commission (Tsentral'noye Upravleniye Narodno-Khozyaystvennogo Uchyota, TsUNKhU) of Gosplan. On 22 April 1932, Sovnarkom adopted the decision On Conducting the all-Union Census in December 1933. On 15 April 1933, Sovnarkom moved the date for the census to the beginning of 1935. On 23 June 1934, Sovnarkom further delayed the census to January 1936. On 15 June 1935, the census date was moved to December 1936. Finally, the census was conducted on 6 January 1937.

The multiple delays were most probably explained by the reluctance to show the catastrophic demographic results of the famine of 1932–1933. The Soviet leadership had fanned great expectations of population growth.

High expectations
On 26 January 1934, Joseph Stalin reported to the 17th Congress of the All-Union Communist Party (b) as one of the main achievements "Growth of population from 160.5 millions at the end of 1930 to the 168 millions at the end of 1933".
On 1 December 1935, Joseph Stalin made a speech, on the Meeting of Kolkhozniks with the Soviet and Party leaders:

Combining his reports, one could have expected to have a population of about 180 million in 1937.

Official statistics based on the registered birth and death rates implied that the 1937 census should show a population of 170–172 million. On 21 September 1935, Sovnarkom adopted a decision On the organization of registration of natural population changes most probably authored by Stalin:

Historian A. G. Volkov, claims that the idea that a significant number of individual deaths were double-counted is absurd, but Soviet historians claimed otherwise. On the other hand, not registering deaths, especially those who died by famine or incarceration, was common. For example, during the Holodomor, starving peasants tried (despite the official ban) to escape to the cities where they could earn or beg for food. Many of them died in the streets. In 1933, the street-cleaning service of Kiev picked up 9,472 dead bodies. Only 3,991 of them were officially counted as deaths on state records, while 5,481 were disposed of without formal registration, per instructions from the prosecutor's office.

Preparation
The official commission for the preparation of the census was formed on 16 September 1935. It included:
 Vyacheslav Molotov, the Chairman of Sovnarkom,
 Lazar Kaganovich, Narkom for transport,
 Anastas Mikoyan, Narkom for the food industry,
 Nikolay Antipov, Vice Chairman of Sovnarkom,
 Nikolai Bulganin, Chairman of Mossovet,
 Emmanuil Kviring, Vice Chairman of Gosplan,
 Ivan Kraval, the chief of TsUNKhU,
 A. S. Popov, deputy to the chief of TsUNKhU.
Later the commission was joined by
 Valery Mezhlauk, the Chairman of Gosplan, who chaired the commission.
All the documents related to the census were prepared by TsUNKhU and edited personally by Joseph Stalin. A. G. Volkov speculates that never in modern history was such a routine technical matter as a census so micromanaged by such high officials.

A comparison between the two variants is shown in the table below:

While his Soviet contemporaries praised Stalin's clarity and brevity in the design of these forms, modern scholars have observed a significant dumbing-down of the original proposals. A lot of information, e.g., about the social structures and income, and migration, could not be deduced from the new forms. Some questions (like the social category) were extremely vague and allowed different interpretations. Volkov argues that it was done deliberately. Stalin removed the double accounting (of those present at the time of the census and of those permanently living at an address), thus significantly reducing the accuracy of the calculations. It was coupled with a very maladroit time for the census: the night from 5 to 6 January – that is, the eve of Russian Orthodox Christmas, when people are extremely mobile.

The main new question introduced by Stalin was the question about religion. According to Volkov, Stalin expected the great majority of people to self-identify as atheists.

Census
The census was held on 6 January 1937. In addition to the general census in the cities, towns and villages, a special census was held by the NKVD in the Gulag camps and among the border guards; by the Red Army, which took a census of military personnel; and the railroad, which took a census of passengers. When the data was first processed, it soon became obvious that the final enumeration would be little more than 162 million people. The worst disagreement between the expected and the obtained data were in Kazakhstan, Ukraine, North Caucasus and the Volga region, the areas that were the strongest hit by the Holodomor genocide.

On 11 January, the chief of TsUNKhU Kraval sent telegrams requesting a total recount of a whole settlement if any doubt arose that somebody might be missing there. Still, despite the total recount in 25,000 settlements, only 4,887 previously unenumerated persons were found. The preliminary result of the census, reported to Stalin in the middle of March 1937, was 162,039,470 people, much lower than the "criminally decreased" registered numbers of 170–172 million or Stalin's expectation of 180 million people.

Another serious blow was a very high percentage of people who stated that they were religious. 55.3 million, or 56.7%, of those who provided answers stated that they were religious (the question was asked only of people older than 16-years old), 42.2 million stated that they were atheists, and around 1 million refused to give an answer. Historian Valentina Zhiromskaya stated that people expected to be persecuted if they declared themselves as belonging to a religion, but considered the answer to be important: If many people would say that they are religious, the authorities would have to open the churches, was a common attitude. The Soviet authorities were so upset by the results of the census that they did not include a question on religion in any future censuses.

Aftermath

In March 1937, the four main statistical professionals working on the Census in TsUNKhU – the chief of the Sector for Population, Mikhail Kurman; chief of the Census Bureau, Olimpiy Kvitkin; his deputy, Lazar Brand; and the chief of the Sector for transportation and communication, Ivan Oblomov, were arrested and imprisoned. Soon they were joined by the Chief of TsUNKhU, Ivan Kraval, and the chiefs of most of the regional statistical centers, and executions followed. Many statisticians, newly appointed in place of those arrested, were soon arrested themselves. There is evidence that many managers appointed to lead the statistical organization tried to avoid starting their new jobs in desperate attempts to escape persecution.

On 25 September 1937, there was a special Sovnarkom decision proclaiming the census invalid and setting a new one for January 1939. A Pravda editorial stated that the "enemies of the people gave the census counters invalid instructions that led to the gross under-counting of the population, but the brave NKVD under the leadership of Nikolai Yezhov destroyed the snake's nest in the statistical bodies".

Stalin had to agree with the lower numbers of population growth. In his report to the 18th Congress of the All-Union Communist Party (bolsheviks) he said:

The new Soviet Census (1939) showed a population figure of 170.6 million people, manipulated so as to match exactly the numbers stated by Stalin in his report to the 18th Congress of the All-Union Communist Party. No other censuses were conducted until 1959.

Today there is a consensus that the results of the 1939 census were adjusted (0.5 to 1.5 million persons were added to the reported population) Some historians consider the 1937 census the only more or less reliable source of demographic data for the period 1926–1959. However, demographers do not consider it as such. The data became influential for evaluating the number of victims of the Great Purge, World War I, and the 1930s famines, including the Holodomor.

References

Censuses in the Soviet Union
Political repression in the Soviet Union
1937 in the Soviet Union
Soviet ethnic policy
Soviet Union